Fatima Soltan (died 1681) was a sovereign khanbika (queen) and last ruler of Qasim Khanate from 1679 until 1681.  

She was a daughter of Agha Muhammad Shah Quli Sayyid and a wife of Arslanghali khan. After the death of her husband in 1627 Russian tsar Mikhail Romanov appointed her and her father Agha Muhammad as regents of her three-year-old son Sayed Borhan. Until Borhan abdicated in 1679 Fatima Soltan resisted his marriage to a Russian princess and the policy of Christianization and discrimination against Muslims by Moscow authorities. After Borhan abdicated she remained briefly in power as the last queen of the Khanate and after her death Qasim Khanate was abolished.

References

Qasim Khanate
Year of birth missing
1681 deaths
17th-century monarchs in Europe
17th-century women rulers